Boul'aos is a town in Djibouti. It is located in the Djibouti region, just outside the capital.

External links
Satellite map at Maplandia.com

Populated places in Djibouti